

Events

Buildings and structures

Buildings

 Holy Trinity Church (Berlin), designed by Christian August Naumann, completed.
 Church of Santa Felicita, Florence, rebuilt by Ferdinando Ruggieri, completed.
 Church of Saint Ildefonso, Porto, Portugal, inaugurated.
 New Room, Bristol, England (Wesleyan Methodist chapel).
 Amalienburg, Munich, Bavaria, designed by François de Cuvilliés, completed.
 Schloss Meseberg, Germany.
 Prinz-Albrecht-Palais, Berlin, completed.
 Crowcombe Court, Somerset, England, designed by Thomas Parker, completed.
 Old Colony House, Newport, Rhode Island, designed by Richard Munday.
 Frescati House, Blackrock, Dublin, Ireland.
 Nahar Singh Mahal, Ballabhgarh, India (approximate date).
 Catherine Canal, Saint Petersburg, dug.

Births
 January 19 – Joseph Bonomi the Elder, Italian architect working in England (died 1808)
 February 15 – Alexandre-Théodore Brongniart, French architect (died 1813)
 September 15 – Juan de Villanueva, Spanish architect (died 1811)
 date unknown – Antonio Cachia, Maltese architect, civil and military engineer and archaeologist (died 1813)

Deaths
 May 10 – Cosmas Damian Asam, German painter and architect (born 1686)
 Richard Munday, American colonial architect (born c.1685)

References 

Architecture
Years in architecture
18th-century architecture